Ryan Gracie (August 13, 1974 – December 15, 2007) was a Brazilian mixed martial artist with a black belt in Brazilian Jiu-Jitsu. He was a member of the Gracie family, and a grandson of Carlos Gracie.

Career 
Ryan trained with his brothers Renzo Gracie and Ralph Gracie, who often served as his cornerman. He also trained Pancrase fighter Gabriel Vella and jiu-jitsu world champion Fabio Leopoldo while in Brazil.

Gracie had seven fights in the PRIDE organization, with his first at PRIDE 10 in 2000 and his most recent at PRIDE Shockwave 2004. PRIDE billed Ryan as the "bad boy" of the family who reputedly gained experience fighting in the streets of Brazil. In interviews in 2004, Gracie expressed a strong interest in fighting Kazushi Sakuraba and Hidehiko Yoshida. Sakuraba, known as the "Gracie Hunter" for his many victories over the Gracie family, earlier defeated Ryan with a decision win in 2000.

Ryan was the leader and head coach of Gracie São Paulo, one of the largest jiu-jitsu associations in Brazil, with affiliated schools spread over the world. 
Supported by his cousins Carlos Russo, Daniel Simões and Renzo Gracie, the academy is home of several world champions.

Personal life 
He was the youngest son of the Brazilian Jiu-Jitsu Master Robson Gracie. On December 8, 2001, his only son, Rayron Gracie, was born. Ryan's brothers are Charles Gracie, Renzo Gracie, and Ralph Gracie.

On January 30, 2021, Ryan's only son Rayron released a short documentary entitled 'Letters to my Father' that reveals his experiences growing up without his father through a series of letters he decided to write to Ryan throughout his teenage years.

Gunshot injury 
In October 2005, Gracie suffered an accidental gunshot wound to the leg while reaching into a closet in his sister's house in Rio de Janeiro, according to a report by GracieMag.com. He was hospitalized and returned to stable condition after receiving a blood transfusion.

Death 

On December 15, 2007, at 7:00am Ryan Gracie was found dead in a jail cell in São Paulo, Brazil. 
At approximately  1:30am, Gracie had been arrested for stealing and crashing a car and attempting to hijack a motorcycle. The owner of the motorcycle hit Gracie on the head, and he was detained by several cyclists until police arrived. A toxicological examination at the Medical Legal Institute was conducted, after which he was transported to the police station. While in jail, Ryan Gracie's wife called psychiatrist Dr. Sabino Ferreira de Faria to attend to him. The psychiatrist was later accused of medical negligence by over prescribing medication and causing the death of Ryan. Ferreira was later sentenced to two years of community service for recklessness. The doctor was with Gracie most of the night, and was notified of Ryan Gracie's death as he was driving home. Gracie was found alone and slumped into a corner when police were doing a routine check of the jail cells.

Mixed martial arts record 

|-
| Win
| align=center| 5–2
| Yoji Anjo
| Submission (armbar)
| PRIDE Shockwave 2004
| 
| align=center| 1
| align=center| 8:33
| Saitama, Japan
| 
|-
| Win
| align=center| 4–2
| Ikuhisa Minowa
| Decision (split)
| PRIDE Bushido 3
| 
| align=center| 2
| align=center| 5:00
| Yokohama, Kanagawa, Japan
| 
|-
| Win
| align=center| 3–2
| Kazuhiro Hamanaka
| KO (soccer kicks)
| PRIDE Bushido 1
| 
| align=center| 1
| align=center| 7:37
| Saitama, Japan
| 
|-
| Win
| align=center| 2–2
| Shungo Oyama
| Technical Submission (armbar)
| PRIDE 22
| 
| align=center| 1
| align=center| 1:37
| Nagoya, Japan
| 
|-
| Loss
| align=center| 1–2
| Tokimitsu Ishizawa
| TKO (injury)
| PRIDE 15
| 
| align=center| 1
| align=center| 4:51
| Saitama, Japan
| 
|-
| Loss
| align=center| 1–1
| Kazushi Sakuraba
| Decision (unanimous)
| Pride 12 - Cold Fury
| 
| align=center| 1
| align=center| 10:00
| Saitama, Japan
| 
|-
| Win
| align=center| 1–0
| Tokimitsu Ishizawa
| KO (punches)
| Pride 10 - Return of the Warriors
| 
| align=center| 1
| align=center| 2:16
| Tokorozawa, Saitama, Japan
|

References

External links 
 

1974 births
2007 deaths
Sportspeople from Rio de Janeiro (city)
Brazilian male mixed martial artists
Middleweight mixed martial artists
Mixed martial artists utilizing Brazilian jiu-jitsu
Brazilian people of Scottish descent
Ryan
Brazilian criminals
People awarded a black belt in Brazilian jiu-jitsu
Deaths in police custody in Brazil
Drug-related deaths in Brazil